Top Country Albums is a chart that ranks the top-performing country music albums in the United States, published by Billboard.  In 1970, 10 different albums topped the chart, which was at the time published under the title Top Country LP's, based on sales reports submitted by a representative sample of stores nationwide.

In the issue of Billboard dated January 3, Charley Pride was at number one with the compilation album The Best of Charley Pride, the record's third week in the top spot.  It remained the atop the chart for a further 10 weeks before being displaced by Okie from Muskogee by Merle Haggard.  Pride would go on to achieve two further number ones during the year.  In the issue of Billboard dated April 25, six weeks after his compilation album vacated the top spot, he returned to the peak position with the album Just Plain Charley, which spent nine non-consecutive weeks atop the listing.  Just three weeks after that album fell from number one for the second time he was back atop the chart with Charley Pride's 10th Album.  In total Pride spent 28 weeks at number one during the year, more than twice as many as any other act.  The first African-American performer to become a major star in the country music field, Pride was at the peak of his success between 1969 and 1971, when he achieved a succession of number one singles as well as his chart-topping albums.

In addition to Pride, Haggard and Johnny Cash each had more than one number one during the year.  Haggard followed Okie from Muskogee, which spent five non-consecutive weeks at number one, with The Fightin' Side of Me, which had a seven-week run atop the listing in the fall.  Both albums were live recordings hurriedly released to cash in the popularity of their respective title songs, both of which topped the country singles chart.  Cash topped the albums listing with Hello, I'm Johnny Cash in March and The Johnny Cash Show in December.  The latter album, released to tie in with his TV series of the same title which ran from June 7, 1969 to March 31, 1971 on ABC, was the year's final chart-topper.  In the fall Conway Twitty achieved his first number-one album when Hello Darlin topped the chart for a single week.  Having experienced success with rock and roll recordings in the 1950s, Twitty had switched to country music in the mid-1960s and would go on to become one of the genre's most successful singers of all time, topping the singles chart a record-breaking 40 times.

Chart history

References

1970-related lists
1970
1970 record charts